The Prisoner 2 1982 computer game by Edu-Ware is a remake of the 1980 game The Prisoner.

Gameplay
In 1982, Edu-Ware released a second version of the game entitled Prisoner 2, with color and improved high-resolution graphics replacing the original's top-down perspective with a first-person view. In addition to the Apple II, this version was also available on the Atari 8-bit and DOS platforms. While sometimes incorrectly considered a sequel due to its title, Prisoner 2 was essentially the same as the first Prisoner game, only with updated graphics and a limited number of design changes, several of which referenced other games:
 A fence (which the player may attempt to jump over) now surrounds the Island.
 Rover's appearance was changed from a white ball to that of an entity resembling Pac-Man.
 The Hospital is now home to the Milgram Experiment, which is now a special event that occurs periodically.
 The Free Information display was moved to the Town Hall; the Hall still houses the Run the Island task but only as a special event occurring periodically.
 The Recreation Hall has expanded obstacle courses.
 The Great Chair has been moved into a multi-roomed building called the Switchyard.  Most rooms are identical to each other except for a single letter on the wall, which together spell out "Rubik's Cube".  Three rooms are special: the Great Chair room itself, the switch room (with a switch to disable the music that accompanies the scrolling game text), and the exit.
 The Library sends the player on literary-themed quests for the Wicked Witch of the West's broomstick or Injun Joe's treasure (from The Adventures of Tom Sawyer), if he chooses not to burn books.
 The building that formerly housed the Milgram Experiment is renamed Grail Hall and contains items for the Library quests.  It is a maze of rooms, including some that mimick the look of Scott Adams' adventure games, or that reference adventure games such as Colossal Cave Adventure (a cave with the word "PLUGH" written on the wall), Wizard and the Princess (a castle, whereupon arrival, the player is sent back to the Castle), and Mystery House (whereupon arrival, the player is told "He's killed Ken!" (a reference to Ken Williams of Sierra On-Line) and is accused of murder until granted absolution in the Church).

Reception
Jeff Rovin for Videogaming Illustrated said that "A great piece of computergaming from both a design point of view and as a challenge, though the lack of originality is disappointing."

C.J. Thorns for ANALOG Computing said that "Prisoner II is a superb package (I dare not call it a "game") that should provide weeks of entertainment. It goes far beyond the traditional "collect the right combination of treasures" adventure, and includes some diabolical arcade-like sequences to frustrate you even more."

Jeff Hurlburt for SoftSide said that "Prisoner 2 is a superbly crafted adventuring experience. Surely among the more complex computer games, it will repay the involved player with hours of enjoyment in a variety of imaginative, challenging, often humorous scenarios."

Softalk said that "You have been forewarned. The time and patient you devote to delving into the mysteries of the Island will be well spent. Be seeing you."

Prisoner 2 was voted the fourth most popular fantasy game in the annual Softalk reader poll in its 1982 poll.

Reviews
Micro 7 - Mar, 1984
Computer Games - Nov, 1983

References

External links
 Playable version of The Prisoner 2 at the Internet Archive
 
 
 Scans of the Prisoner 2 design document
Review in Compute!s Guide to Adventure Games

1982 video games
Adventure games
Apple II games
Atari 8-bit family games
DOS games
Edu-Ware games
Single-player video games
Video games based on television series
Video games set in prison
Video games developed in the United States